John Neville Simpson (16 May 1927 – 1 June 2016) was an Australian fencer. He competed in the individual and team épée events at the 1960 Summer Olympics.

References

1927 births
2016 deaths
Australian male fencers
Olympic fencers of Australia
Fencers at the 1960 Summer Olympics
Sportspeople from Sydney
Commonwealth Games medallists in fencing
Commonwealth Games bronze medallists for Australia
Fencers at the 1958 British Empire and Commonwealth Games
Medallists at the 1958 British Empire and Commonwealth Games